Elh Kmer (born November 12, 1998) is a Cameroon-born French rapper based in Boulogne-Billancourt, France.

Life 
He is the youngest of a family of 5 kids and was born in Yaounde, Cameroon. Elh Kmer arrived in France to run from misery in Africa and live the African dream.  He arrived in France at the age of 11 years, where he developed passion for football and rap, in which he developed a strong passion and affinity very young.

Description 
People describe him to be curious, and interested by all music types, indeed of that he stopped school very prematurely. As he didn't find himself in the educational system he rapidly developed his rapper skills.

Rap quickly became what he was made for, he spent all his time in school writing texts at the age of 14. Ambitious  Elh Kmer wanted to develop his rapper skills.

At the age of 17, Mr Sosa (nickname) decided to start his career as rapper with his childhood and best friends fs  Braki and  Vesti .

Career 
Elh kmer was at the origin of the group  SDHS (Soldat des Hauts de Seine) with which he released the titles, Soldats Certifiés, Soldats Paré, Los ratos and Gangsta.

 He gained recognition when his group 40000 Gang signed under Capitol Music France when he released a single " SOSA" with more than 6.8 million views on YouTube. 40000 Gang released a mixtape in June 2015 called " Anarchie " on which he sang on 5 song namely  Mula, Lamborghini, Free Og, Heure du Crime, and Les meilleurs featuring Booba.

Label 
After resigning from Capitol records France, he created his own Label Ombre et Lumière, under which he released his first single as independent  Sarajevo with two other freestyles  de l’ombre #Audi et #2016Followme.

Ombre et lumiere now consist of Elh Kmer, Vesti, and Braki.

Clothing brand 
After separating from the group he created his own clothing brand known as "MR SOSA". Currently he is developing a website for his label and brand which will be available very soon.

External links
 Booska-P
 Facebook
 Single "Sarajevo" on iTunes 
 Album "Anarchie" on FNAC
 Album "Anarchie" on Universal Music France

References

1995 births
Living people
Cameroonian emigrants to France
French rappers